Gomel is a city in Belarus.

Gomel may also refer to:

Places
 Gomel Region, a province (voblast) of Belarus
 Gomel District, Belarus
 Gomel Governorate, an administrative division of the Russian Soviet Federative Socialist Republic from 1919 to 1926

Sports
 FC Gomel, a Premier League football club based in the city
 FC DSK Gomel, a First League football club based in the city
 HC Gomel, an ice hockey club based in the city

People
 Aakarshit Gomel (born 1993), Indian cricketer
 Benjamin Gomel (born 1998), French footballer
 Bob Gomel (born 1933), American photojournalist